The Man on the Burning Tightrope is the fourth album by Firewater, released in 2003 through Jetset Records.

Track listing

Personnel 
Firewater
Tod Ashley – vocals, bass guitar, Mellotron, bouzouki, production, design
Oren Kaplan – guitar
Tamir Muskat – drums, loops, production, mixing
Paul Wallfisch – organ, piano, celesta
Additional musicians and production
Dave Ballou – trumpet, flugelhorn on "Too Many Angels"
Joe Fiedler – trombone on "The Vegas Strip", "Ponzi's Revenge" and "Don't Make It Stop"
Victoria Hanna – vocals on "Dark Days Indeed" and "Dark Days Revisited"
Scott Hull – mastering
Yuri Lemeshev – accordion on "Dark Days Indeed", "Dark Days Revisited" and "Before the Fall"
Willy Martinez – percussion on "Too Much (Is Never Enough)", "The Truth Hurts" and "Ponzi's Revenge"
James Moore – cover art
Morgan St. Boot Boys – stomping on "Dark Days Indeed"
The Muskat Orchestra – horns on "Anything at All", strings on "Secret", arrangement on "Secret" and "The Vegas Strip"
Ramallah Orphan Choir – backing vocals on "Dark Days Indeed"
Asaf Roth – glockenspiel and cymbal on "Fanfare" and  "Before the Fall", marimba on "The Vegas Strip"
Dan Shatsky – mixing
Itamar Ziegler – bass guitar on "Too Much (Is Never Enough)" and "Secret"

References

External links 
 

Firewater (band) albums
2003 albums
Jetset Records albums